An Incident with Polynin is a 1970 Soviet drama film directed by Aleksey Sakharov.

Plot 
The film tells about the young Moscow actress Galina, who at the beginning of the war goes to the Karelian Front. The commander of an aviation regiment colonel Polynin watched her performance, and they fell in love with each other. Soon he was transferred to serve near Moscow, and the actress asked him to put her letter in a mailbox there. She explained that the letter was about her work. Actually, it was addressed to her lover, a prominent theater director. Polynin decided not to put the letter to the mailbox, but to bring it to the addressee himself.

The film is characterized by the deep psychological insight into the feelings and emotions of the personages, which is typical of Simonov's works. Superb acting of Russian film stars Vertinskaya and Efremov makes the film a masterpiece devoted to World War II.

Cast 
 Anastasiya Vertinskaya
 Oleg Efremov
 Oleg Tabakov as Viktor Balakirev
 Georgiy Burkov
 Bella Manyakina
 Nonna Mordyukova
 Aleksandr Khanov
 Lev Durov
 Yuri Prokopovich
 Nina Spiglazova
 Gennadiy Chikhachev
 Vladimir Kashpur

References

External links 
 

1970 films
1970s Russian-language films
Soviet drama films
1970 drama films